Posthumous is a 2014 American-German film directed by Lulu Wang and starring Brit Marling and Jack Huston.  It is Wang's directorial debut.

Plot
Frustrated with his lack of success, artist Liam Price (Jack Huston) destroys his work in front of a Berlin gallery. However, when he passes out drunk, a homeless man steals his belongings. The man is found dead with Liam's drawings and everyone believes that he is Liam and has killed himself. When Liam realizes his art is worth more after his death, he devises an elaborate plan to make money off of his supposed demise. Meanwhile, an American journalist (Brit Marling) decides to write a story on Liam's life, which puts his ruse in jeopardy.

Cast
Brit Marling as McKenzie Grain
Jack Huston as Liam Price
Lambert Wilson as Daniel S. Volpe
Alexander Fehling as Erik Adler
Tom Schilling as Ben
Nikolai Kinski as Kaleb Moo
Isabelle Redfern as Randy
Martin Stange as Detective
Fabian Stumm as Curator 1
Harald Siebler as Arman Rubell
Julie Trappett as Shannon
Pamela Knaack as Camille Seekamp

References

External links
 
 

German romantic comedy films
English-language German films
2014 directorial debut films
American romantic comedy films
2014 romantic comedy films
Films set in Berlin
Films set in Coral Gables, Florida
Films shot in Florida
Films scored by Dustin O'Halloran
2010s English-language films
2010s American films
2010s German films